830 Naval Air Squadron was a Royal Navy Fleet Air Arm squadron formed in Malta in July 1940 flying Fairey Swordfish torpedo bombers. During 1940–41 the squadron carried out attacks against the Axis supply effort in the Mediterranean. These included torpedo attacks against merchant ships and their Royal Italian Navy warship escorts, and also bomb attacks on port installations in Sicily and Libya. In July 1941 the squadron began operations with ASV RDF airborne radar to locate ships. Operations were mostly by night, with some dusk bombing sorties to Sicily. By March 1942 the squadron was so depleted that it merged with 828 Naval Air Squadron and continued operations. By March 1943, however, losses were such that the composite squadron ceased to exist.

In May 1943, 830 Squadron was reformed in its own right at Lee-on-Solent as a torpedo-bomber reconnaissance squadron operating Barracuda IIs. Most of the squadron's personnel at this time were New Zealanders. After completing training, in March 1944 the squadron embarked upon  and subsequently participated in Operation Tungsten, a dive bombing attack on the German battleship Tirpitz.

In October 1944 the squadron was absorbed by 827 Naval Air Squadron and ceased to exist.

The squadron was reformed in October 1955 with the Westland Wyvern turboprop strike fighter. Flying from HMS Eagle, 830's Wyverns took part in Suez operation of November 1956, before again disbanding in January 1957.

References

Military units and formations established in 1940
Military units and formations disestablished in 1944
800 series Fleet Air Arm squadrons